Paul Di Filippo (born October 29, 1954) is an American science fiction writer. He is a regular reviewer for print magazines Asimov's Science Fiction, The Magazine of Fantasy and Science Fiction, Science Fiction Eye, The New York Review of Science Fiction, Interzone, and Nova Express, as well as online at Science Fiction Weekly. He is a member of the Turkey City Writer's Workshop. Along with Michael Bishop, Di Filippo has published a series of novels under the pseudonym Philip Lawson.

Antonio Urias writes that Di Filippo's writing has a "tradition of the bizarre and the weird".

His novella A Year in the Linear City was nominated for a Hugo award.

Early life 
Di Filippo was born in Woonsocket, Rhode Island.

Critical reception 
Antonio Urias praised the collection The Steampunk Trilogy (1995) in a brisk review, writing in summary that the tripartite book "contains three bizarre and occasionally humorous novels taking the reader from Queen Victoria's amphibian doppelganger to racist naturalists and black magic, and finally the interdimensional love story of Emily Dickinson and Walt Whitman."

Bibliography

References

External links
 
 Paul Di Filippo: author's page at 40kBooks.com 
 Weird Universe created by Di Filippo, Alex Boese & Chuck Shepherd
 
 Paul Di Filippo at The Encyclopedia of Science Fiction
 Paul Di Filippo's online fiction at Free Speculative Fiction Online
 Golden Gryphon Press site for Strange Trades
 2006 interview with Paul Di Filippo at small WORLD podcast

1954 births
Living people
20th-century American male writers
20th-century American novelists
20th-century American short story writers
21st-century American male writers
21st-century American novelists
21st-century American short story writers
American male novelists
American male short story writers
American science fiction writers
Analog Science Fiction and Fact people
Asimov's Science Fiction people
The Magazine of Fantasy & Science Fiction people
Writers from Providence, Rhode Island
Weird fiction writers